Conway is an unincorporated community and census-designated place (CDP) in Emmet County in the U.S. state of Michigan.  As of the 2010 census, the CDP had a population of 204.

Geography
Conway is located in southeastern Emmet County, in southeastern Little Traverse Township. A portion of the CDP extends south into Bear Creek Township. The community is at the western end of Crooked Lake. U.S. Route 31 passes through the CDP, leading southwest  to Petoskey, the county seat, and northeast  to Alanson.

The community of Conway was listed as a newly-organized census-designated place for the 2010 census, meaning it now has officially defined boundaries and population statistics for the first time.

Demographics

References 

Unincorporated communities in Michigan
Unincorporated communities in Emmet County, Michigan
Census-designated places in Emmet County, Michigan
Census-designated places in Michigan